Telico is an unincorporated community in northeastern Ellis County, Texas, United States on Highway 34.

History
The area that became Telico was settled before 1856. It was first called Trinity City, but was renamed in the mid-1850s to Telico after Telico, North Carolina. The town was based on agriculture and had a cotton gin that local farmers used for several decades until they renovated it in the early 2000's to create a wedding venue.

Notable residents 
 Clyde Barrow, born near Telico, an outlaw in the team Bonnie and Clyde, who traveled the Central United States during the Great Depression in the early 1930s.
Jason Massey Murderer of two teenagers. His case was later on the popular crime show Forensic Files

References

External links
 Telico, TX at Handbook of Texas

Unincorporated communities in Ellis County, Texas
Dallas–Fort Worth metroplex
Unincorporated communities in Texas